The PBA on BBC was a presentation of Philippine Basketball Association games on Banahaw Broadcasting Corporation.

Broadcasting team (1976)
 Dick Ildenfonso and Emy Arcilla

See also
Philippine Basketball Association
Banahaw Broadcasting Corporation

BBC
Banahaw Broadcasting Corporation original programming
1970s Philippine television series
1976 Philippine television series debuts
1976 Philippine television series endings
Philippine sports television series

ceb:PBA on BBC